David Meekison (November 14, 1849February 12, 1915) was an American lawyer and politician who served as a two-term U.S. Representative from Ohio from 1897 to 1901.

Early life and career 
Born in Dundee, Scotland, Meekison immigrated to the United States in 1855 with his parents, who settled in Napoleon, Ohio. He attended the common schools and was then apprenticed to the printer's trade. He served with the artillery in the United States Army 1866–1869.

After mustering out of the service, Meekison returned to Napoleon and studied law. He was appointed city clerk in 1872.

He was admitted to the bar in 1873 and commenced practice in Napoleon, Ohio.
He served as prosecuting attorney of Henry County 1873–1879.
Probate judge 1881–1888.
He served as delegate to the Democratic National Convention in 1884.
He engaged in banking. He established the Meekison Bank at Napoleon in 1886. He served as mayor of Napoleon 1890–1897.

Congress 
Meekison was elected as a Democrat to the Fifty-fifth and Fifty-sixth Congresses (March 4, 1897 – March 3, 1901). He was not a candidate for renomination in 1900 and subsequently resumed the practice of his profession. He also engaged in banking.

Family life
He married Clara E. Bowers of Napoleon, August 24, 1881, and she and four children survived him.

Death
He died in Napoleon, Ohio, February 12, 1915, and was interred in Glenwood Cemetery.

References

 Retrieved on 2009-5-16

1849 births
1915 deaths
People from Napoleon, Ohio
People from Dundee
United States Army soldiers
Ohio lawyers
Mayors of places in Ohio
Scottish emigrants to the United States
19th-century American politicians
Politicians from Dundee
19th-century American lawyers
Democratic Party members of the United States House of Representatives from Ohio